Kaza Kajami-Keane (born January 27, 1994) is a Canadian - Jamaican professional basketball player for Le Mans Sarthe of the LNB Pro A. He played college basketball for the Illinois State Redbirds, the Cleveland State Vikings and the Carleton Ravens. He has also competed for the Canadian national basketball team.

Professional career

Raptors 905
Kajami-Keane made his professional debut with Raptors 905 in the NBA G League. In the 2017–18 season, he averaged 6.3 points and 4.2 assists in 18.5 minutes per game.

Landstede Zwolle
In August 2018, Kajami-Keane signed with Landstede Basketbal of the Dutch Basketball League (DBL).
On 1 June 2019, Kajami-Keane won the DBL championship with Landstede, the first in club history. Kajami-Keane was named the DBL Play-offs MVP, after averaging 18.3 points and 5.3 assists in 12 playoff games.

Mitteldeutscher BC
On July 31, 2019, Kajami-Keane signed with Mitteldeutscher BC, for sponsorship reasons for the 2019–20 season. With MBC, he would play in the German Basketball Bundesliga (BBL). He averaged 15.2 points, 5.3 assists and 2.7 rebounds per game.

Le Mans Sarthe
On June 8, 2020, Kajami-Keane signed with Le Mans Sarthe of the LNB Pro A. He averaged 12.2 points and 4.1 assists per game. Kajami-Keane re-signed with the team on June 25, 2021.

National team career
On December 3, 2017, Kajami-Keane made his debut in the Canadian national basketball team in a 94–67 win over Brazil at the 2019 FIBA Basketball World Cup qualification stage.

References

External links

RealGM profile

1994 births
Living people
2019 FIBA Basketball World Cup players
Basketball people from Ontario
Canadian expatriate basketball people in the Netherlands
Canadian expatriate basketball people in the United States
Canadian men's basketball players
Carleton Ravens basketball players
Cleveland State Vikings men's basketball players
Dutch Basketball League players
Illinois State Redbirds men's basketball players
Landstede Hammers players
Le Mans Sarthe Basket players
Mitteldeutscher BC players
People from Ajax, Ontario
Point guards
Raptors 905 players